, abbreviated to , is a national university in Japan. The main campus is located in Kanayagawa, Fukushima City, Fukushima Prefecture.

History 

The university at first consisted of two faculties: the Faculty of Liberal Arts (in Hamada-cho Campus) and the Faculty of Economics (in Moriai Campus).
In 1966 the Faculty of Liberal Arts was renamed Faculty of Education.
In 1979 the former two campuses were integrated into newborn Kanayagawa Campus.
In 1987 a new faculty was added: the Faculty of Administration and Social Sciences.
In 2004 the faculties were reorganized into two  consisting of four .

Faculties (Undergraduate Schools) 
 Cluster of Human and Social Sciences
 Faculty of Human Development and Culture
 Faculty of Administration and Social Sciences
 Faculty of Economics and Business Administration
 Course of Liberal Arts for Modern Society (in Machinaka Branch)
 Cluster of Science and Technology
 Faculty of Symbiotic Systems Science

Graduate Schools 
 Graduate School of Education
 Major in School Education
 Major in School Subject Education
 Major in Clinical Psychology and School Education
 Graduate School of Public Policy and Regional Administration
 Major in Public Policy and Regional Administration
 Graduate School of Economics
 Major in Economics
 Major in Business Administration
 Graduate School of Symbiotic Systems Science and Technology

Institutes 
 University Library
 Research Center for Lifelong Learning and Education
 Center for Regional Affairs
 Center for Research and Development of Education

References

External links 
 Official Website 
 FukushimaUniversity Youtube 

Japanese national universities
Universities and colleges in Fukushima Prefecture
1949 establishments in Japan
Educational institutions established in 1949
Fukushima (city)